Myth in Primitive Psychology is a 1926 book by anthropologist Bronisław Malinowski.

References

External links 
 Full text of Myth in Primitive Psychology at HathiTrust Digital Library

1926 non-fiction books
Anthropology books
Psychology books
Mythography